WOSM (103.1 FM) is a radio station broadcasting a News/Talk format. Licensed to Ocean Springs, Mississippi, United States, the station serves the Biloxi-Gulfport-Pascagoula area.  The station is currently owned by Stephen Davenport, through licensee Telesouth Communications, Inc., and features programing from AP Radio and Salem Communications.

As Ocean Springs' first radio station, WOSM covers local sports and community events .

References

External links

OSM
Radio stations established in 1983